Below are listed political parties registered at the Ministry of Interior of Spain 1985–1993. 
Note that:
 The Ministry does not appear to remove registrations if parties are dissolved or become dormant, and a large part of the groups mentioned no longer exists today.
 In several cases the groups listed were electoral alliances formed to contest a specific election.
 In several cases, the registered parties are regional affiliates or branches of a nationwide party.
 Some of the organizations listed are not political parties per se. For example, a handful of youth wings of political parties are listed.
 Parties listed in the order by which they were registered.

The listing

1985

1986

1987

1988

1989

1990

1991

1993

Registered political parties